Monticello High School is a coeducational public secondary institution located in Monticello, Illinois. It is a part of Community Unit School District #25. The school draws from the towns of Monticello, Cisco, and White Heath; and the counties of Piatt, Champaign, and DeWitt.

History
A Monticello High School building was built in 1894 and was in use by the district as part of Washington Elementary. The current high school building was constructed directly next to the original structure. However, due to renovation plans, the 1894 building was struck down in the summer of 2019. A new gymnasium (Art "Buz" Sievers Center) was completed in 2020 at the site of the 1894 structure. A new auditorium and various new classrooms were also completed for the start of the 2020-2021 school year.

Athletics
Monticello boys and girls teams participate in the Illini Prairie Conference, a high school athletic conference whose member schools have similar enrollments and are all located in the central Illinois region. The statewide class designation is A, 1A, or 2A, depending on the sport.

The mascot is the Sages, which is often represented by a wise owl. The Sage mascot is named "Sammy Sage". The basis comes from the Thomas Jefferson nickname "Sage of Monticello", which is also the town's namesake.  It is a unique nickname among schools in the United States.

State Trophies:

Basketball: 2017 (4th), 2022 (2nd)

Boys Cross Country: 2010 (3rd), 2011 (3rd), 2013 (3rd), 2014 (State Champion), 2018 (3rd), 2019 (State Champion)

Boys Track & Field: 2011 (3rd)

Football: 2018 (State Champion)

Girls Cross Country: 2011 (3rd), 2012 (2nd), 2017 (3rd), 2019 (2nd)

Girls Track & Field: 2018 (3rd)

Softball: 2013 (3rd)

Monticello Music and the Marching Sages
Monticello High School has boasted an exemplary music program which is headed by band director Alison Allender and choral director Tricia Shaw. The Monticello Marching Sages are known as one of the finest high school marching bands of Central Illinois. With their productions titled Lincoln (2017) and The Only Way Out ... Is Through (2019), the Marching Sages won the Governor's Trophy both of those years at the Illinois Marching Band Championships and regularly compete at the Bands of America Super Regional in St. Louis, MO.

Notable alumni
 Robert C. Burke, 1967, posthumously awarded the Medal of Honor; killed in action during the Vietnam War
 Harry Combes, 1933, head basketball coach, University of Illinois 1947–1967
 Allen F. Moore, 1886, U.S. Representative
 Rolla C. McMillen, U.S. Representative
 Dina Nelson (Johnson), 1985, First female staff drummer on the Grand Ole Opry (Nashville, TN)

References

External links
 Monticello CUSD #25 - Monticello High School

Public high schools in Illinois
Education in Piatt County, Illinois